Eucalyptus fraseri, commonly known as Balladonia gum, is a species of tree or mallet that is endemic to Western Australia. It has smooth white to greyish bark, lance-shaped or curved adult leaves, flower buds in groups of seven or nine, white flowers and cup-shaped, conical or hemispherical fruit.

Description
Eucalyptus fraseri is a tree or mallet that typically grows to a height of  but does not form a lignotuber. It has smooth white to greyish bark that is shed in ribbons, sometimes with rough, dark bark near the base. Flowering occurs between January and March or April and the flowers are white.

Taxonomy and naming
Balladonia gum was first formally in 1972 by Ian Brooker in the journal Nuytsia and was given the name Eucalyptus conglobata subsp. fraseri. Brooker collected the type specimen near Balladonia. In 1976, Brooker raised the subspecies to species status as Eucalyptus fraseri. The specific epithet (fraseri) honours Sir Malcolm Fraser, Surveyor General of Western Australia from 1872 to 1883.

In 2001, Lawrie Johnson and Ken Hill described two subspecies and the names have been accepted by the Australian Plant Census:
 Eucalyptus fraseri (Brooker) Brooker subsp. fraseri has smooth bark throughout;
 Eucalyptus fraseri subsp. melanobasis L.A.S.Johnson & K.D.Hill has a stocking of thick, hard black bark on the lower  of the trunk.

Distribution and Habitat
Eucalyptus fraseri grows in open shrubland on open plains, low dunes and hilly areas between Norseman, Scaddan and Balladonia growing in calcareous loam or sandy soils over limestone. Subspecies melanobasis has a distribution restricted to the upper parts of the Fraser Range.

Conservation status
Subspecies fraseri is classified as "not threatened" but subspecies melanobasis is classified as "Priority Two" by the Western Australian Government Department of Parks and Wildlife, meaning that it is poorly known and from only one or a few locations.

See also
List of Eucalyptus species

References

fraseri
Endemic flora of Western Australia
Myrtales of Australia
Eucalypts of Western Australia
Trees of Australia
Plants described in 1972
Taxa named by Ian Brooker